Reid's Butcher Shop is a heritage-listed former shop at 462 Guinea Street, Albury, City of Albury, New South Wales, Australia. The property is owned by John and Margaret-Anne Baker. It was added to the New South Wales State Heritage Register on 2 April 1999.

History 

The building dates from the 1870s. It remained a butcher's shop until 1962.

It underwent major renovations in the late 2000s, funded by Heritage New South Wales in conjunction with private funding.

Description

It is a Victorian-era corner shop and residence with a verandah that extends to the kerb.

Heritage listing 
Reid's Butcher Shop was listed on the New South Wales State Heritage Register on 2 April 1999.

See also 

 List of butcher shops

References

Attribution 

New South Wales State Heritage Register
Albury, New South Wales
Retail buildings in New South Wales
Articles incorporating text from the New South Wales State Heritage Register
Butcher shops
Shops in Australia